"Samba de uma Nota Só", known in English as "One Note Samba", is a bossa nova and jazz standard song composed by Antônio Carlos Jobim with Portuguese lyrics by Newton Mendonça. The English lyrics were written by Jon Hendricks. It was first recorded by João Gilberto in 1960 for his album O Amor, o Sorriso e a Flor.

The song title refers to the main melody line, which at first consists of a long series of notes of a single tone (typically D, as played in the key of G) played over a descending chord progression in a bossa nova rhythm. The first eight measures consist of D, followed by four measures of G, and then four measures of D. This is followed by eight measures of a more conventional, scalar melody line.

This well-known song first reached a wide audience on the Grammy-winning bossa nova LP Jazz Samba (Getz/Byrd/Betts), which reached the number one spot on the Billboard 200 in 1963.  Another well-known release is the Sergio Mendes-Brasil '66 version, in medley with "Spanish Flea".

The song was featured in a prominent scene of "A Man Without a Skin", a 1963 episode of Naked City. The song was mentioned in the song "Astrud" by Basia. Rogério Skylab parodied the song as "Samba de uma Nota Só ao Contrário" on his 2009 live album Skylab IX.

Notable recordings
 Adalberto Bravo – Smooth Passions (2004)
 Charlie Byrd – More Brazilian Byrd (1967)
 Bossacucanova – Revisited Classics (1998)
 Royce Campbell – A Tribute to Charlie Byrd (2004)
 Kate Ceberano – Kate Ceberano and her Septet (1986)
 June Christy – Something Broadway, Something Latin (1965)
 Rosemary Clooney & John Pizzarelli – Brazil (2000)
 Blossom Dearie – Sweet Blossom Dearie (1967)
 Eumir Deodato & Barbara Mendes – soundtrack from Bossa Nova (film) (2000)
 Eliane Elias – Eliane Elias Plays Jobim (1990)
 Duke Ellington – Alive and Rare (1969)
 Percy Faith – Latin Themes for Young Lovers (1965)
 Ella Fitzgerald – Ella Abraça Jobim, Pablo (1981)
 João Gilberto – The Legendary Joao Gilberto (1960)
 Dizzy Gillespie – New Wave (1962)
 Eydie Gormé – Blame It on the Bossa Nova (1963)
 Clare Fischer – So Danço Samba (1964)
 Stan Getz and Charlie Byrd – Jazz Samba (1962)
 Bebel Gilberto and Vinicius Cantuaria – Next Stop Wonderland (1998)
 Vince Guaraldi and Bola Sete — The Navy Swings (1965)
 Al Jarreau – Expressions (2001)
 Antônio Carlos Jobim – The Composer of Desafinado, Plays (1963)
 Quincy Jones – Big Band Bossa Nova (1962)
 Preben Kaas and Jørgen Ryg – Hvad Skal Vi Med Kvinder (1964)
 Stacey Kent – The Changing Lights (2013)
 Lambert, Hendricks & Bavan – "Recorded "Live" at Basin Street East" (1963)
 Nara Leão – Dez Anos Depois (1971)
 Peggy Lee - I'm A Woman (1963)
 Herbie Mann – Brazil, Bossa Nova & Blues (1962)
 Herbie Mann and Tom Jobim – Do the Bossa Nova with Herbie Mann (1962)
 Sérgio Mendes – Herb Alpert Presents Sérgio Mendes & Brasil '66 (1966)
 Modern Jazz Quartet and Laurindo Almeida on Collaboration (1964)
 Sitti Navarro – Café Bossa (2006)
 Olivia Ong – A Girl Meets BossaNova 2 (2006)
 Joe Pass and Ella Fitzgerald – Fitzgerald and Pass... Again (1976)
 Tiger Okoshi - Face To Face (1989)
 Perrey and Kingsley – Kaleidoscopic Vibrations: Spotlight on the Moog (1967)
 The Postmarks – By the Numbers (2008)
 Cliff Richard – Kinda Latin (1966)
 Frank Sinatra and Antonio Carlos Jobim – Sinatra & Company (1971)
 Stereolab – Aluminum Tunes (1998)
 Stereolab and Herbie Mann – Red Hot + Rio (1996)
 Barbra Streisand (in a medley with "Johnny One Note") – Barbra Streisand...And Other Musical Instruments (1973)
 Sylvia Telles – Amor em Hi–Fi (1960)
 Caterina Valente – Caterina Valente Live 1968
 Carol Welsman – Inclined (1997)
 Gregory Golub - jazz piano and vocal version -(2013)
 식료품groceries – 슈퍼마켓Yes! We're Open (2014)

See also
List of bossa nova standards

Notes 

Bossa nova songs
Bossa nova jazz standards
Brazilian songs
Frank Sinatra songs
Nancy Wilson (jazz singer) songs
Portuguese-language songs
Songs with lyrics by Antônio Carlos Jobim
Songs with music by Antônio Carlos Jobim
Barbra Streisand songs
1963 songs
Songs with lyrics by Newton Mendonça
Songs about music